The black-necked swan (Cygnus melancoryphus) is a species of waterfowl in tribe Cygnini of subfamily Anserinae. It is found in Argentina, Brazil, Chile, Uruguay, and the Falkland Islands.

Taxonomy and systematics

The black-necked swan has occasionally been placed by itself in genus Sthenelides. Its closest relatives are the black swan (C. atratus) and mute swan (C. olor). It is monotypic.

Description

The black-necked swan is the only member of its genus that breeds in the neotropics, and is the largest waterfowl native to South America. Males weigh  and females . The sexes are alike. Adults' body plumage is white and the neck and head black; the latter usually has a white stripe behind the eye. They have a prominent red knob at the base of their bill. Juveniles are grayish rather than white and lack the knob until their third or fourth year.

Distribution and habitat

The black-necked swan is found in the southern tier of South America. It nests from Tierra del Fuego north to central Chile, Uruguay, and Rio Grande do Sul in extreme southern Brazil. It withdraws from the southern half of Argentina in winter and is then found as far north as Brazil's São Paulo state. It is a year-round resident of the Falkland Islands. Vagrants have been found on Juan Fernández Island, the South Orkney Islands, the South Shetland Islands, and the Antarctic Peninsula.

The wetlands created in Chile by the 1960 Valdivia earthquake, such as Carlos Anwandter Nature Sanctuary on the Cruces River, have become important population centers for the black-necked swan.

The black-necked swan inhabits freshwater marshes and swamps, shallow lakes, brackish lagoons, and sheltered coastal sites. On the mainland of South America it is often found near human habitation, but shuns built up areas in the Falklands.

Behavior

Feeding

The black-necked swan's diet is almost entirely vegetarian. It feeds on aquatic plants like Chara, Potamogeton, Typha; algae such as Aphantotece and Rhyzoclonium; and presumably small numbers of aquatic invertebrates. In parts of Chile its principal food is Egeria densa. It forages mostly by immersing its head and neck and by surface feeding, but also upends to reach deeper. In times of drought it has been observed grazing in meadows and pastures.

Breeding

The black-necked swan's breeding season varies geographically. In the far south of its range it breeds from July to November but ends as early as September in the northern parts. In the Falklands it breeds between August and November. The exact timing of breeding appears dependent on rainfall. The species is believed to form long-term pair bonds. Its nest is a mound of vegetation constructed by both members of a pair on a small islet or partially floating in a reedbed. The clutch size is four to eight eggs. Males guard females during the 34 to 36 day incubation period. Captive nestlings fledged about 100 days after hatch.

Vocalization

The black-necked swan is mostly silent outside the breeding season. During that time both sexes give a "soft, musical 'Whee-whee-whee' with accent on initial syllable", repeating it to challenge intruders. The call is also used to maintain contact between members of a pair. Males also give "a musical 'hooee-hoo-hoo'."

Status and conservation

The IUCN has assessed the black-necked swan as being of Least Concern. It has a very large range, and though its population size is not known it is believed to be stable. No immediate threats have been identified. It is widespread and generally common. Large scale hunting in the 18th and 19th centuries extirpated it from much of Chile but it has recolonized those area. Some egg collecting and hunting still occur, however. The species occurs in several protected areas in mainland Argentina, in which country the population is estimated at 50,000.

Gallery

References

Further reading
David, N. & Gosselin, M. (2002). "Gender agreement of avian species names." Bull. B. O. C. 122: 14–49.

External links

Stamps (for Argentina, Brazil, Chile, Falkland Islands, Uruguay) with RangeMap
Black-necked Swan photo gallery VIREO

black-necked swan
Birds of Chile
Birds of the Falkland Islands
Birds of the Pampas
Birds of Patagonia
black-necked swan
black-necked swan